Ente Hridayathinte Vadakku Kizhakke Attathu (English: At the North-East corner of my heart) is a 2017 Indian Malayalam short film directed by Anup Narayanan. Aneesha Ummer and Bibin Mathai are the main protagonists.

Plot
The story is set up in a college where on the final day of the current batch of students. Priya and George are classmates. George is a young priest who has taken the vows of celibacy. After the dispersal of the class, Priya (Aneesha Ummer) meets George (Bibin Mathai), alone in the corridor and confesses her love to him. The rest of the film deals with an exploration of the young priest's mind and his emotional conflicts. Finally George and Priya meet after a few years at the baptism of Priya's twin daughters.

Cast
 Aneesha Ummer as Priya
 Bibin Mathai as George
 Vishnu Vidhyadharan as Anil
 Roshan Anand as Scriptwriter
 Manoj M B as Professor
 Sangeeth Soman

Critical reception
Newindianexpress.com remarked that  "Short movie 'Ente Hridayathinte Vadakku Kizhakke Attathu' goes viral."

References

Indian short films
2010s Malayalam-language films